Nathan O'Driscoll (born 17 May 2002) is an Australian rules footballer playing for the Fremantle Football Club in the Australian Football League (AFL).

AFL career

O'Driscoll was selected by the Fremantle Football Club with the 27th pick in round 2 of the 2020 national draft. O'Driscoll grew up in Northam, Western Australia, he is the younger brother of AFLW player Emma O'Driscoll.

2022: Debut Season 
After not playing any AFL games in 2021, he made his AFL debut as the medical substitute for Fremantle in round 2 of the 2022 AFL season against St Kilda. He entered the game in the final quarter after Sean Darcy injured his ankle and kicked a spectacular goal from near the boundary line. He received his first Goal of the Year nomination in round 8 against the North Melbourne Kangaroos with an incredible set shot drop punt from the left pocket.  O'Driscoll was sidelined prior to round 9 due to a stress fracture in his foot.  

Nathan returned to the line-up for Fremantle in the round 21 clash against the Western Bulldogs, O'Driscoll earned the defining moment of the game in which he received the ball just outside of centre square before outpacing Western Bulldogs vice captain Jack MacCrae and kicking a goal from 50-metre arc. O'Driscoll received a 2022 AFL Rising Star nomination for his performance in round 23 against  at Manuka Oval in Canberra.

Statistics
 Statistics are correct to the end of round 10, 2022

|- style="background-color: #EAEAEA"
! scope="row" style="text-align:center" | 2022
|
| 30 || 7 || 6 || 5 || 60 || 42 || 102 || 27 || 12 || 0.9 || 0.7 || 8.6 || 6.0 || 14.6 || 3.9 || 1.7
|- class="sortbottom"
! colspan=3| Career
! 7
! 6
! 5
! 60
! 42
! 102
! 27
! 12
! 0.9
! 0.7
! 8.6
! 6.0
! 14.6
! 3.9
! 1.7
|}

Notes

References

External links

 
WAFL player profile

2002 births
Living people
Fremantle Football Club players
Peel Thunder Football Club players
Perth Football Club players
Australian rules footballers from Western Australia
People from Northam, Western Australia